Joe Cocker Live is a live album by Joe Cocker, released in 1990. It was recorded live 5 October 1989 at Memorial Auditorium in Lowell, Massachusetts with the exception of the last two tracks which were recorded in the studio.  The album was re-released in 2011 under the title Joe Cocker's Greatest Hits Live.

Track listing
"Feelin' Alright" (Dave Mason) – 4:43
"Shelter Me" (Nick Di Stefano) – 4:26
"Hitchcock Railway" (Donald Lewis Dunn, Tony McCashen) – 3:58
"Up Where We Belong" (Jack Nitzsche, Buffy Sainte-Marie, Will Jennings) – 4:35
"Guilty" (Randy Newman) – 2:40
"You Can Leave Your Hat On" (Randy Newman) – 4:20
"When the Night Comes" (Bryan Adams, Jim Vallance, Diane Warren) – 4:52
"Unchain My Heart" (Robert W. "Bobby" Sharp Jr.) – 5:50
"With a Little Help from My Friends" (John Lennon, Paul McCartney) – 9:13
"You Are So Beautiful" (Billy Preston, Bruce Fisher) – 4:23
"The Letter" (Wayne Carson Thompson) – 4:31
"She Came in Through the Bathroom Window" (Paul McCartney) – 2:30
"High Time We Went" (Joe Cocker, Chris Stainton) – 7:58
"What Are You Doing With a Fool Like Me" (Diane Warren) – 4:51 – Studio bonus track
"Living in the Promiseland" (David Lynn Jones) – 3:55 – Studio bonus track

Personnel
Joe Cocker – lead vocals

with:
Phil Grande – guitar
Keith Mack – rhythm guitar, guitar solo on "The Letter"
T.M. Stevens – bass, backing vocals
Deric Dyer – tenor saxophone, percussion, keyboards
Jeff Levine – keyboards
Chris Stainton – keyboards
Steve Holley – drums
Crystal Taliefero – percussion, backing vocals
Doreen Chanter – backing vocals
Maxine Green – backing vocals, duet on "Up Where We Belong"

The Memphis Horns on 6, 8, 9, 11, 12 & 13
Andrew Love – tenor saxophone
Gary Buho Gazaway – trumpet
Wayne Jackson – trumpet

studio tracks only:
Earl Slick – guitar
Keni Richards – drums
Bashiri Johnson – percussion
Fonzi Thornton – backing vocals
Tawatha Agee – backing vocals
Vaneese Thomas – backing vocals

Technical
Michael Barbiero – production, engineering
Michael Lang – production
Steve Thompson – production
Guy Charbonneau – engineering
Herb Ritts – photography

Charts

Weekly charts

Year-end charts

Certifications

References

Joe Cocker live albums
1990 live albums
Capitol Records live albums